Joseph Robert Cowgill (23 February 1860 – 12 May 1936) was an English prelate of the Roman Catholic Church. He served as the third Bishop of Leeds.

Life and ministry

Joseph Cowgill was born in village Broughton in North Yorkshire on 23 February 1860. He was ordained to the priesthood on 19 May 1883 at an age of 23.

He then served as assistant priest in the Diocese of Leeds. On 26 September 1905, Cowgill was appointed as coadjutor Bishop of Leeds and titular Bishop of Olena. He received his episcopal consecration on 30 November 1905 from Thomas Whiteside, Bishop (later Archbishop) of Liverpool, with Francis Mostyn, Bishop of Menevia (later Archbishop of Cardiff) and Samuel Webster Allen, Bishop of Shrewsbury serving as co-consecrators.

Cowgill became the third Bishop of Leeds, when he succeeded William Gordon who died in office on 7 June 1911.

Joseph Cowgill was known as Children's Bishop. He was the one to set up (in 1911) the Diocesan Rescue and Protection Society to develop a more systematic approach to addressing the needs of poverty and disadvantage in the Diocese. An annual collection in all missions and the annual Good Shepherd collection in schools was established that year to fund the new initiative. So Catholic Care was established.

He died on 12 May 1936 and was buried at the Killingbeck Cemetery in Leeds.

References

External links
Diocese of Leeds

1860 births
1936 deaths
20th-century Roman Catholic bishops in England
Roman Catholic bishops of Leeds